The jungle shrew (Suncus zeylanicus) is a species of mammal in the family Soricidae endemic to Sri Lanka.  Its natural habitat is subtropical or tropical dry forests. It is threatened by habitat loss.

Description
Its pelage is dark gray above, and lighter in the underparts. Hairs appear dark at the base and lighter at the tip. The tail is short and gray, sometimes with a white tip.

References

Mammals of Sri Lanka
Suncus
Taxonomy articles created by Polbot
Mammals described in 1928